The Parliament of Northern Ireland was the home rule legislature created under the Government of Ireland Act 1920, which existed from 7 June 1921 to 30 March 1972, when it was suspended. It was subsequently abolished under the Northern Ireland Constitution Act 1973.

The first Government or Executive Committee of the Privy Council of Northern Ireland was led by  James Craig (Lord Craigavon from 1927), who was Prime Minister between 7 June 1921 and 24 November 1940.

Cabinet

Ministries of the Parliament of Northern Ireland
1921 establishments in Northern Ireland
1940 disestablishments in Northern Ireland